Public School No. 29, also known as Lamborn Library, is a historic school building located at Hockessin, New Castle County, Delaware.  It was built in 1870 as a one-room school; a second floor and classroom was added about 1890. is a two-story, brick building on a stone foundation with basement.  It has a gable roof and features fish-scale shingles and Stick style detailing on the gable ends.  It was occupied by a school until 1932, after which it was used as a library and community center.  The library moved to a new building in 1994.

It was listed on the National Register of Historic Places in 1978.

References

One-room schoolhouses in Delaware
School buildings on the National Register of Historic Places in Delaware
Libraries on the National Register of Historic Places in Delaware
School buildings completed in 1870
Schools in New Castle County, Delaware
National Register of Historic Places in New Castle County, Delaware